Masum Khan (born 5 July 1987) is a Bangladeshi cricketer. He made his List A debut for Khelaghar Samaj Kallyan Samity in the 2016–17 Dhaka Premier Division Cricket League on 12 April 2017. He made his Twenty20 debut for Khelaghar Samaj Kallyan Samity in the 2018–19 Dhaka Premier Division Twenty20 Cricket League on 25 February 2019. He made his first-class debut on 10 October 2019, for Chittagong Division in the 2019–20 National Cricket League.

References

External links
 

1987 births
Living people
Bangladeshi cricketers
Chittagong Division cricketers
Khelaghar Samaj Kallyan Samity cricketers
Place of birth missing (living people)